In geometric topology, PDIFF, for piecewise differentiable, is the category of piecewise-smooth manifolds and piecewise-smooth maps between them. It properly contains DIFF (the category of smooth manifolds and smooth functions between them) and PL (the category of piecewise linear manifolds and piecewise linear maps between them), and the reason it is defined is to allow one to relate these two categories. Further, piecewise functions such as splines and polygonal chains are common in mathematics, and PDIFF provides a category for discussing them.

Motivation 

PDIFF is mostly a technical point: smooth maps are not piecewise linear (unless linear), and piecewise linear maps are not smooth (unless globally linear) – the intersection is linear maps, or more precisely affine maps (because not based) – so they cannot directly be related: they are separate generalizations of the notion of an affine map.

However, while a smooth manifold is not a PL manifold, it carries a canonical PL structure – it is uniquely triangularizable; conversely, not every PL manifold is smoothable. For a particular smooth manifold or smooth map between smooth manifolds, this can be shown by breaking up the manifold into small enough pieces, and then linearizing the manifold or map on each piece: for example, a circle in the plane can be approximated by a triangle, but not by a 2-gon, since this latter cannot be linearly embedded.

This relation between Diff and PL requires choices, however, and is more naturally shown and understood by including both categories in a larger category, and then showing that the inclusion of PL is an equivalence: every smooth manifold and every PL manifold is a PDiff manifold. Thus, going from Diff to PDiff and PL to PDiff are natural – they are just inclusion. The map PL to PDiff, while not an equality – not every piecewise smooth function is piecewise linear – is an equivalence: one can go backwards by linearize pieces. Thus it can for some purposes be inverted, or considered an isomorphism, which gives a map  These categories all sit inside TOP, the category of topological manifold and continuous maps between them.

In summary, PDiff is more general than Diff because it allows pieces (corners), and one cannot in general smooth corners, while PL is no less general that PDiff because one can linearize pieces (more precisely, one may need to break them up into smaller pieces and then linearize, which is allowed in PDiff).

History

References

Geometric topology